Probie may refer to:
Probationary, as an abbreviation
Probe / Men in Video Awards, also called "The Probies"
Probie, a nickname for fictional NCIS character Timothy McGee